The 1982 United States Senate election in Wyoming took place on November 2, 1982. Incumbent Republican Senator Malcolm Wallop ran for his second term. He was challenged in the general election by former State Senator Rodger McDaniel, the Democratic nominee. Despite the strong national environment for Democratic candidates that year, Democratic Governor Edgar Herschler's landslide re-election, and the closeness of Wallop's campaign with former Democratic Senator Gale W. McGee in 1976, the contest between Wallop and McDaniel was largely non-competitive. Wallop won re-election by a wide margin, winning 57% of the vote to McDaniel's 43%.

Democratic primary

Candidates
 Rodger McDaniel, former State Senator

Results

Republican Primary

Candidates
 Malcolm Wallop, incumbent U.S. Senator
 Richard Redland, rancher, far-right activist

Results

General election

Results

References

1982
Wyoming
United States Senate